Dean Street Studios is a commercial recording studio located at 59 Dean Street, Soho, London, England.

History
The premises are first known to have been used as a film studio in 1950s, which then became Zodiac Studios.

The studio was bought by producer Tony Visconti in 1977 and operated for 13 years under the new name Good Earth Studios, with Paul Cartledge taking the role of a studio manager. Here Visconti recorded and produced such famous acts as T. Rex, David Bowie, Phil Lynott and Thin Lizzy.

In 1989, Joe & Co bought the lease and expanded into the rest of the basement, by building a few more music recording/production suites.

Jasmin Lee, the daughter of Alvin Lee from Ten Years After, took over the business in 2007 and re-launched it as Dean Street Studios, in partnership with the studio head engineer and director Ben Roulston. She has since then been managing it successfully and has seen many well-established, as well as up-and-coming, artists come back to work at Dean Street regularly because of the studio's central location. These artists include Marc Almond, Paul Weller, Florence and the Machine, Ed Sheeran, Tom Odell and many others. Lee also went on to establish Dean St Live – a production company for various events in the UK and around Europe.

Apart from Dean Street Studios, the premises are also home to a production company Yellow Boat Music, an audio post-production company Guilt Free, and independent producers Charlie Russell, Bradley Spence and Alex Beitzke. Collectively, they occupy all the other four, smaller production suites that are let on a long-term basis.

Artists
Artists who have more recently worked at Dean Street Studios:
 Adele
 Alfie Boe
 Cee Lo Green
 Courtney Hadwin
 Duran Duran
 Ed Sheeran
 Fightmilk
 Florence and the Machine

 James Arthur
 JLS
 John Legend
 Kaiser Chiefs
 KSI
 Kelly Rowland
 Miles Kane
 Noel Gallagher
 O'Hooley & Tidow
 Paloma Faith
 Paul Epworth
 Paul Weller
 Plan B
 Robert Plant
 The Fades
 The Wanted
 The Weeknd
 Tom Odell
 Wolf Alice

References

External links
 Official Dean Street Studios website

Recording studios in London